Superliga Femenina de Voleibol 2015–16 was the 47th season since its establishment in 1970. Eleven teams played the championship this season.

The season comprises regular season and championship playoff. Regular season started on October 10, 2015 and ended on April 2, 2016. Championship playoff began on April 9 with semifinals. 

Top four teams when finishing regular season play playoff while two bottom teams are relegated.

Naturhouse Ciudad de Logroño won its third title in a row (2014, 2015 & 2016) after defeating Fïgaro Peluqueros Haris in the Championship Final playoff 3–0.

Teams

Regular season standings

Championship playoff

Bracket

Semifinals

Match 1

|}

Match 2

|}

Match 3

|}

Match 4

|}

Match 5

|}

Final

Match 1

|}

Match 2

|}

Match 3

|}

Top scorers
(Regular season and playoff statistic combined.)

References

External links
Official website

1ªFemale
2015 in women's volleyball 
2015 in Spanish sport 
2016 in women's volleyball 
2016 in Spanish sport